Novy God is the Russian phrase for "New Year", and also designates the Russian New Year's Eve and New Year's Day celebration.

Similar customs are observed in all post-Soviet states, and though the observance of the holiday is criticised by conservative Muslim groups in Central Asia, and nationalists in Ukraine, it remains popular across the region.

Traditions
Since the era of the Soviet Union, Novy God has usually been considered a gift-giving holiday with similarities to Christmas (albeit in a secular form), with New Year trees (yolka) decorated and displayed in homes and public spaces,  and Ded Moroz depicted as delivering presents to children on New Year's Eve (similarl to the Western figure of Santa Claus), with assistance from his granddaughter Snegurochka.

The President's New Year's address is traditionally televised shortly before midnight in each time zone, reflecting on the previous year and the state of the country. At Moscow's Red Square, revellers gather under the Kremlin Clock—whose chimes at midnight are traditionally followed by the playing of the Russian national anthem, and a fireworks display.

Russia-1 televises the annual special Little Blue Light, which features music and variety acts, while the Soviet film The Irony of Fate is also traditionally aired on New Year's Eve.
 
Russians generally take the week between New Year and Christmas (celebrated on 7 January, corresponding to Christmas Day according to the Julian Calendar) off (Новогодние каникулы "New Year's holidays").

History 
From AD 1492, the new year was originally celebrated on 1 September as per the Byzantine calendar. In 1699, Peter the Great issued a proclamation adopting the Christian era beginning in 1700 and also changing the celebration of the new year to 1 January. He called for streets to be decorated with the branches of fir, juniper, and pine trees for the holiday. The tradition later evolved into the practice of decorated New Year trees, although their use in homes was hindered by the Slavic superstition of fir trees being associated with funeral rites.

After the October Revolution, Russia adopted the Soviet calendar, which was derived from the Gregorian calendar, in 1918. In 1929, the Communist Party of the Soviet Union abolished all religious holidays, including Christmas, as part of a wider campaign against religion. Soviet officials argued that Christmas was a pagan ritual of sun worship and that the Christmas tree was a bourgeois symbol originating from Germany — one of Russia's World War I enemies.

In December 1935, via a letter published by the party's official newspaper Pravda, politician Pavel Postyshev proposed that the New Year be celebrated as a secular holiday benefiting Soviet youth. The celebration would adopt Christmas traditions in a secular form, including New Year trees (stated to symbolise happiness and prosperity among youth) replacing Christmas trees, and the figure of Ded Moroz.

On television, the Soviet variety show Little Blue Light (Goluboy ogonyok) traditionally ran an episode on New Year's Eve from 1962 to 1985.

Even after the dissolution of the Soviet Union and the reinstatement of religious holidays, Novy God has remained a popular celebration in modern Russia, and among Soviet expats living in other countries. The Little Blue Light New Year's Eve special was revived in 1997, and Ded Moroz has continued to be emphasised in an effort to prevent the encroachment of Santa Claus; a residence in the town of Veliky Ustyug is promoted as his "home", children are encouraged to write letters to him, and GLONASS has promoted a Ded Moroz "tracker" on New Year's Eve similar to the NORAD Tracks Santa campaign.

In other countries

Israel
In Israel, Novy God (נובי גוד) is celebrated by many first– and second–generation Russian Jewish immigrants from the Soviet Union, with celebrations being particularly prominent in areas with a large ex-Soviet population (such as Ashdod, Ashqelon, Beersheba, Netanya, and Haifa). Some customs have been adapted for Israeli environs, like the use of palm trees for the New Year tree and starting celebrations using the Moscow time zone.

In Israel, New Year's Eve celebrations that are associated with the Gregorian calendar or Christianity are referred to as Silvester, to distinguish it from the Jewish New Year of Rosh Hashanah (which takes place 2–3 months earlier). As Pope Sylvester I is considered to have been an anti-semite, New Year's Eve celebrations have not been as popular among the Israeli Jew population. Those who celebrate Novy God are sometimes seen as out of line with the national Jewish identity despite the event's lack of religious affiliation, with some having confused it for Christmas or Silvester; amongst ultra-orthodox groups, anti-Novy God flyers and chain letters are common, and in 2004 a bill that would ban the presentation of Christmas iconography in schools was presented to the Knesset. In the late-2010s, campaigns were undertaken to promote public awareness of the holiday among Israelis and the 1.5 generation, while Prime Minister Benjamin Netanyahu also began to acknowledge the holiday in his greetings.

It is common to allow soldiers of Russian-speaking heritage serving in noncombat facilities to go on leave on the night of the 31st to allow them to celebrate the holiday; however, this is not enforced by official order.

See also
 Old New Year

References

External links
 
 
 

January observances
New Year in Russia
Public holidays in Russia
Winter events in Russia
Winter traditions
Russian-Jewish culture in Israel